Cheaters at Play is a 1932 American pre-Code drama film directed by Hamilton MacFadden and written by Malcolm Stuart Boylan. The film stars Thomas Meighan, Charlotte Greenwood, William Bakewell, Ralph Morgan, Barbara Weeks and Linda Watkins. The film was released on January 27, 1932, by Fox Film Corporation.

Cast       
Thomas Meighan as Michael Lanyard
Charlotte Greenwood as Mrs. Crozier
William Bakewell as Maurice Perry
Ralph Morgan as Freddie Isquith
Barbara Weeks as Fenno Crozier
Linda Watkins as Tess Boyce
Olin Howland as Secretary
James Kirkwood, Sr. as Detective Crane
E. E. Clive as Steward

References

External links
 
 

1932 films
1932 drama films
American black-and-white films
American drama films
Films directed by Hamilton MacFadden
Fox Film films
Films based on short fiction
The Lone Wolf films
1930s English-language films
1930s American films